The Argentina national handball team is the national handball team of Argentina and is controlled by the Argentina Handball Association.

Tournament results

Olympic Games

World Championship

Pan American Games

Pan American Championship

South and Central American Championship

Other competitions

 2014 Four Nations Tournament – 3rd
 2015 Provident Kupa – 2nd
 2016 Christmas Handball Tournament of Four – 3rd
 2016 Qatar International Handball Tournament – 4th
 2017 International Tournament of Spain – 4th
 2017 Four Nations Tournament – 2nd
 2018 International Tournament of Spain – 3rd
 2019 Four Nations Handball Tournament –

Team

Current squad
Squad for the 2023 World Men's Handball Championship.

Head coach: Guillermo Milano

Statistics

Most appearances

Top scorers

Notable players
Eric Gull
Andrés Kogovsek

References

External links

IHF profile

Handball in Argentina
Men's national handball teams
Hand